Wachovia  was the area settled by Moravians in what is now Forsyth County, North Carolina, US.  Of the six 18th century Moravian "villages of the Lord" established in Wachovia, today the town of Bethania and city of Winston-Salem exist within the historic Wachovia tract.  The historical tract was somewhat larger than present-day Winston-Salem and somewhat smaller than present-day Forsyth County.

History
Wachovia's early settlers were mostly German-speaking people who shared a common Germanic cultural background.

In 1752 Moravian Bishop August Gottlieb "Brother Joseph" Spangenberg led an expedition to locate the area where the Unitas Fratrum, or Moravian church, intended to begin the Wachovia settlements.  Members of the Moravian Church in Europe purchased  of land in the backcountry (middle/western area) of North Carolina, from John Carteret, 2nd Earl Granville.

The land in North Carolina was purchased on behalf of the Moravians by John Henry (Johann Heinrich) Antes, who had also served as agent on behalf of the Moravians in the purchase of the  tract which became the city of Bethlehem, Pennsylvania.  He also served as Baumeister ("construction manager") of the first buildings which still stand in Bethlehem's historic district.  were purchased by Johann Steinhauer, leader of the Moravian church in Riga (today's Latvia).

"Wachovia" is a Latinized form of the German name Wachau. It was chosen as the name of the North Carolina Moravian tract to honor Count Zinzendorf, Moravian patron and bishop whose family estate was located in the Wachau region northwest of Vienna, along the Danube River between the towns of Melk and Krems. Bishop Spangenberg and the surveying team in 1752 strayed into the mountains of western North Carolina, coming down through what is now Wilkes County (viz. "Moravian Falls" etc.) on their way to the Three Forks of Muddy Creek.  It was this mountainous landscape in the Carolina back country along the Catawba, Little, New and Yadkin Rivers that suggested the Wachau region in Lower Austria.

Twelve Moravian Single Brethren traveling from Pennsylvania, most from the Christiansbrunn farm near Nazareth, arrived in Wachovia in 1753, forming Bethabara, in Hebrew meaning "House of Passage", a transitional congregational settlement founded November 17, 1753.  In July 1756, during the French and Indian War (1754–1763), a wooden stockade was built around the central-most area of the Moravian settlement, and Bethabara became a place of refuge for settlers from across the region, with many refugees living near the Bethabara Mill, numbering 120 by May 1759.

The first planned Moravian settlement, and oldest incorporated municipality in Wachovia is Bethania, North Carolina formed June 12, (1759), also known historically as Bethany, meaning in the Hebrew language, "house/place of dates and figs." Bethania is the German form of Bethany. The Town of Bethania, North Carolina was incorporated 1995, following the reactivation of Bethania's 1838/1839 town charter, and was spared from being annexed into the city of Winston-Salem.  Today, Bethania remains the only independent, continuously active Moravian town in the southern United States.  In 2007, Historic Bethania, a visitor center and museum, opened in Bethania, providing information and historical interpretation in yet another Wachovia Moravian community.

Wachovia's central administrative congregational town of Salem, which can be visited presently in Old Salem Museums and Gardens.  Salem was begun in 1766 (formally organized in 1771), and was built by Moravians and friends from Bethabara and Bethania.

Subsequent Moravian congregational settlements to be formed include Friedberg (1769), Friedland (1772), and Hope (1775). The congregation at Hope was the first "English" Moravian church in the area.

A secular county seat was founded in 1849 in newly drawn Forsyth County, north of Salem.  Winston was the name given to the new county seat in 1852.  R.J. Reynolds Tobacco Company, maker of Winston, Salem and Camel cigarettes, was founded at Winston in 1875. The towns of Salem and Winston merged as Winston-Salem in 1913. Bethabara now lies within the city limits of Winston-Salem, and can be visited today in Historic Bethabara Park, operated by the city of Winston-Salem and Forsyth County.

Over time, the  Wachovia Tract was redrawn into the following counties as the backcountry of North Carolina became increasingly populated:

 1753 Rowan County
 1771 Surry County
 1789 Stokes County
 1849 Forsyth County was drawn out of what had been the southern half of Stokes County

Museums
Historic Bethabara Park, Historic Bethania, and Old Salem Museums and Gardens are museums which serve to transport visitors in time to what Wachovia once was.  The museums each contribute to the story of Moravians in North Carolina, and preserve, interpret, and demonstrate life in Wachovia over time.

Wachovia Corporation

The area is the namesake and birthplace of Wachovia Corporation, once one of the world's largest banks.  The bank was pioneered by Bethanian I.G. Loesch.  Salem, then Winston-Salem, was the corporate headquarters for the bank until its merger with the First Union corporation, when the headquarters was moved to Charlotte, North Carolina.

Linguistic note
Present day students and scholars who are not familiar with the German language frequently, albeit incorrectly, use a masculine article "der" to modify "Wachau" when the feminine article "die" should be used, as historically documented.  When speaking of "Wachovia" as a place, the proper title in German is "die Wachau".  When speaking of "Wachau" in a locative sense, such as "in the Wachau," the article becomes dative and written as "in der Wachau."  Many individuals and organizations have seen the dative phrase and have irresponsibly and unknowingly dropped the preposition, leaving "...der Wachau," which is incorrect when used as a proper noun.  The feminine gender of "die Wachau" does not change, though the case might.

See also
Adelaide Fries- author of the 1907 The Mecklenburg Declaration of Independence As Mentioned in the Records of Wachovia.

References

External links
 Historic Bethabara Park
 Historic Bethania
 Old Salem Museums and Gardens
 The Moravian Archives of Winston-Salem, NC, US
 The Moravian Church Archives, Bethlehem, PA, US

Geography of Forsyth County, North Carolina
Pre-statehood history of North Carolina
History of the America (South) Province of the Moravian Church
Geography of Winston-Salem, North Carolina
Moravian settlement in North Carolina